Paul Wintrebert (1867–1966) was a French embryologist and a theoretician of developmental biology.

He coined the term cytoskeleton (cytosquelette) in 1931.

He held radical epigenetic views. In his 60s, he published a trilogy in which he describes his position on life process and living being: Le vivant créateur de son évolution (The living being is the creator of his own evolution) (1962), Le développement du vivant par lui-même (The self-development of the living being) (1963), and L'existence délivrée de l'existentialisme (Existence delivered from existentialism) (1965).

He was a critic of the mutationist theory of evolution. His views have been described as a "biochemical Lamarckism".

References

1867 births
1966 deaths
French embryologists
French biologists
Lamarckism